The 45th edition of the annual Vuelta a Venezuela was held from August 25 to September 7, 2008. The stage race started in Maracaibo, and ended in Caracas.

Stages

2008-08-25: Maracaibo — Maracaibo (80 km)

2008-08-26: Cabimas — Valera (188.6 km)

2008-08-27: Caja Seca — Mérida (183.2 km)

2008-08-28: Mucuchies — Guanare (172.6 km)

2008-08-29: Ospino — Nirgua San Vicente (217.6 km)

2008-08-30: Valencia — Valencia (80 km)

2008-08-31: Puerto Cabello — San Juan de los Morros (139.6 km)

2008-09-01: Ortiz — Valle de la Pascua (161.4 km)

2008-09-02: Las Mercedes del Llano — Chaguaramas (40 km)

2008-09-03: Valle de la Pascua — Pariaguan (159.1 km)

2008-09-04: Cantaura — Cantaura (80 km)

2008-09-05: Cantaura — Barcelona (147.3 km)

2008-09-06: Piritu — Higuerote (231.8 km)

2008-09-07: Caracas — Caracas (80 km)

Final standings

General Classification

Points Classification

Mountains Classification

Sprints Classification

Stage Points Classification

References 
 live-radsport
 wvcycling

Vuelta a Venezuela
Venezuela
Vuelta Venezuela